The 1970–71 Scottish Division One was won by Celtic by two points over nearest rival Aberdeen. St Mirren and Cowdenbeath finished 17th and 18th respectively and were relegated to the 1971–72 Second Division.

League table

Results

See also
Nine in a row

References

League Tables

1970–71 Scottish Football League
Scottish Division One seasons
Scot